Tenement Museum may refer to:

Lower East Side Tenement Museum, a museum in Manhattan, New York City.
14 Henrietta Street, a museum in Dublin, Ireland.